The Chato were an indigenous people of the Southeastern Woodlands, that formerly lived on the coast in Mississippi and Alabama and around Mobile Bay. They were related to the Choctaws and Chickasaws.  One source indicates that "The Chato were part of the Apalachee Indian tribe, as were the Escambe." However, the more general opinion is that the Chato tribe was of unknown ethnic affinity, although they were allied with the Choctaw.

The Chato people were first located west of the Apalachicola River, north of the Choctawhatchee Bay and St Joseph’s Bay off of the coast of the Gulf of Mexico in Florida during the mid 17th century.  Though they are known as the Chato in some texts, others have labeled the Chato as the Chatot Tribe, considering ‘Chato’ as a synonymous name referring to same group of individuals.  Various synonyms have sprung up referring to the Chato People over the course of their discovery due to miscommunications and misinterpretations of the Chato as an entirely different group as they moved westward along the Gulf of Mexico.  When the Chato were first discovered west of the Apalachicola River they were known as the Chacâtos, Chaqtos, Chatots and the Chactots; after numerous relocations of the tribe new synonyms referring to the names of the Chato People were generated after their sighting in 1763.  These synonymous names included the Chactoo, Chacchous, Chaetoos and Chattoos.

The culture and nature of the Chato are largely unknown due to the lack of recorded history on their way of life.  Based on the proximal location of the Chato to the neighboring Apalachee Tribe, it is inferred that the Chato’s culture and way of living were similar to that of the Apalachee.  The language of the Chato is completely unknown alongside their neighboring tribes (Pensacola, Apalachee, Mobila, Tohomé, Naniaba), though by the end of the 17th century there were reports of these tribes communicating in Mobilian, a culmination of several Native languages mixed together as the tribes were forced together in the same region of Mobile.  In 1805 in Louisiana, Missouri there were reports of various Native groups that gathered in the region, “...as having distinct languages of their own.”  In particular observers noted, “15 single, small groups and two pairs of speaking languages distinct from all others.  These [groups] were the Adai, Akokisa, Apalachee, Bidai, Biloxi, Chatot, Eyeish, Kitsai, Maye, Opelousa, Pakana, Pascagoula, Taensa, Tonkawa, and Tunica, the Natchitoches and Yatsai, and the Atakapa and Karankawa.”

After their initial discovery by the Spanish in 1639, the Chato requested the building of missionaries in 1648.  At this time relations between the Chato and the Spanish were not heated, reports of the neighboring Apalachee tribe complaining of carrying pelts for the Chato indicated that the Chato were at least somewhat involved in the Spanish trade network.  Despite this implicit amiability, the missionaries were not erected in Chato territory until 1674 in which two mission villages were built for the Chato around the site known as Marianna, located at a subsidiary river approximately 25 miles west of the Apalachicola River.

In 1675 the Chato executed a religious revolt against the missionaries due to the suffocating nature of the Spaniards attempting to impress the Christian religion upon Chato beliefs.  The conflict did not last long due to another neighboring tribe, the Chisca, that continually raided the missionary villages.  The Chato and Apalachee banded with the Spanish to deter the Chisca raids, which climaxed in 1677 when a Spanish force containing 10 Chato attacked a town hosting a festival of roughly 300 Chato, Pensacola and Chisca participants.  This particular battle ended without conclusion and prompted the Chato to relocate to an abandoned town and establish a new town, San Carlos de los Chacatos, located southwest of the Marianna region.

After the Chato firmly settled in San Carlos de los Chacatos they continued practicing the Christian faith.  Several pockets of Chato retained their original lifestyle off of the Pensacola Bay.  In the following decades the majority of the Chato persisted with missionary life but outside influences endangered the integrity of the system. In 1684, Shawnee slavers are recorded as selling Chato slaves to white settlers in Carolina, presumably acquired from the missions or surrounding pockets of non-Christian denizens.  The Apalachicola tribe outright raided San Carlos de los Chacatos in 1695, further destabilizing San Carlos.

In 1699, "a band of 40 Chacatos on a buffalo hunt, led by a Spaniard, attacked a peaceful Tuskegee trading party, killing 16 and stealing their goods." This led to several reprisals by Carolinian settlers and their Indian allies; in two separate events in 1702 and 1704, Carolinian and Apalachicolan raiders attacked Spanish missions in Florida, presumably including San Carlos de los Chacatos.  Following these attacks in August 1704, 200 Chatos along with an unnumbered amount of Apalachees were found at Mobile Bay with French forces seeking refuge.  The following statement, “Juan, chief of the Chato, was allotted territory at the mouth of the river where he, his mother Jacinta and two hundred of his villagers moved to the site called the Oignonets, location of present-day Mobile” shows that the Chato still held onto some form of their traditions by the start of the 18th century.

From the settlement of Mobile the Chato were integrated into the faith of the French Roman Catholics, “...in 1707, the son of the Chacato chief was recorded as baptized by the French priest.”  At this time the Chato were said to be speaking the Choctaw and French languages.  A flood of Fort St. Louis in 1711 caused the French to relocate Fort St. Louis to the location of Mobile.  The Chato present here were relocated two leagues further south to the Dog River still off of the Mobile Bay.

The last major interaction of the Chato with European colonial powers was the British takeover of Florida in 1763, which led to the Chato and fellow tribes of the region migrating westwards. Afterward the Chato People vanished from history outside of cursory sightings as they were continuously pushed westward along the coast, “They were at Rapides, Louisiana, in 1773, apparently on the Red River in 1796, on Bayou Boeuf in 1803 and 1805, and on the Sabine River in 1817.”

Notes

Muskogean tribes
Native American tribes in Alabama
Native American tribes in Mississippi
South Appalachian Mississippian culture